Šipovo is a town and municipality located in Republika Srpska, an entity of Bosnia and Herzegovina. It is situated in the southern part of the Bosanska Krajina region. As of 2013, it has a population of 10,293 inhabitants, while the town of Šipovo has a population of 4,052 inhabitants.

History

The Glogovac monastery of the Serbian Orthodox Church is near the town.

Geography
It is located between municipalities of Mrkonjić Grad in the west, Jezero in the north, Jajce and Donji Vakuf in the east, and Kupres (Republike Srpske) and Glamoč in the south.

In the broader geographical sense, the town of Šipovo is located at 44 17’ north and 170 06’ east, in the zone of temperately continental climate.

The population consists of 95% of Serbs and 5% of Bosniacs.

Šipovo is a mountain area, intersected in the west–east direction by the Pliva River, whose length is about 30 kilometres of the air line, and in the south–north direction by the Janj River, whose length is about 35 kilometres of the air line. Besides these two rivers, the Šipovo area is also intersected by three small rivers – Sokočnica, Lubovica and Volarica. The area around the mouth of the Janj River to the Pliva River is both plain and hilly, with the height of around 440 metres above sea level. It gradually slopes up to become the mountain area whose highest mountains are Vitorog (1906 m) in the south, Lisina (1335 m) in the north, Gorica (1267 m) in the east, and Čardak (1452 m) in the west.

The urban area lies in the northern part of the town, in the basin of the aforementioned rivers. The 60% of the population of Šipovo lives in this urban area. In terms of traffic, two important roads stretch across Šipovo along the valleys of the rivers Pliva and Janj: Banjaluka-Šipovo-Kupres and Jezero-Šipovo-Glamoč. The relief of the area of Šipovo consists of the following relief constituents:

the mountain massifs (Vitorog, Plazenica, Ravna Gora, Gorica, Lisina, and Čardak);
plateaus (natpoljsko-čuklićka, podobzirsko-pribeljačka, and strojičko-podovska);
the valleys of the rivers Pliva and Janj

Geological formation
The forming of ground (the pedologic composition of it) and its physical and chemical characteristics are dominantly influenced by relief, geologic base, climate, and vegetation. Given aforementioned facts, there are three typical types of grounds in the area: valley ground, hill ground, and mountain ground. In the region of Šipovo, there are the following types of soil: podzoli, smedja, and to some extent muck (černozem), and flotsam in the valleys of the rivers the Pliva and the Janj. The diversity of soil and other elements (like climatic regime and height above sea level) have influenced the diversity of flora and fauna in the region. In the lowest parts, there are deciduous trees (beech and hornbeam), and in the higher parts, there are evergreen trees (spruce, fir, and pine).

Vaganj cave and valley
The relief of the Šipovo region is mostly formed from sediment lime rocks and dolomite. The areas of lime are intersected by numerous tectonic fissures on which many forms of relief are formed valleys like Vaganj, depressions, inlets, pits, and caves. The most famous cave being Vaganj Cave, 990 metres above sea level, decorated with countless stalactites and stalagmites.

Climate
In the geomorphologic sense, Šipovo is a mountain region whose average height is 800 metres above sea level. In the global climatic sense, Šipovo lies in temperately continental zone, with certain differences the reason for which being variations in height above sea level, as well as topographic and vegetational elements. The air temperature is the basic climatic element. The average annual temperature is 10˚C, the average summer temperature is 20˚C, and the average winter temperature is around 0˚C. The average annual insolation is 1800 hours, which makes five hours per day. The average annual humidity is around 85%. Precipitations are very important climatic element. The average value of annual precipitations is 990 mm. The average number of snowy days is 120, whereas the vegetational period lasts for about 250 days. There are a lot of foggy days in Šipovo. Winds are very often in the southern part of the area (Janjska visoravan) due to intermixing of the Mediterranean and continental air masses over Janj.

Forestry and agriculture
Owing to all these diversities, the inhabitants of the area are given the possibility of going in for various fields of agriculture (farming, fruit growing, cattle breeding, fishing, and apiculture), tourism and so forth. Forty-eight percent (223.99 km²) of the Šipovo region is covered with forests, thirty-three percent (154.8 km²) with meadows and pastures, fourteen percent (66.03 km²) with fields and orchards, and four percent (17.38 km²) with unproductive land.

Demographics

Population

Ethnic composition

See also
Municipalities of Republika Srpska

References

External links

 https://turizamrs.org/en/sipovo/
 http://sipovo-tourism.com/V2/turisticki-programi/?lang=en

 
Populated places in Šipovo
Cities and towns in Republika Srpska